Dulaney is an unincorporated community in Caldwell County, Kentucky, United States.

A post office was established in the community in 1872, and it was probably named for Henry F. Delany, a prominent local lawyer.

References

Unincorporated communities in Caldwell County, Kentucky
Unincorporated communities in Kentucky